Alfred Mohrbutter (10 December 1867, Celle - 21 May 1916, Potsdam) was a German painter, graphic designer, and etcher.

Life and work 
His father, Friedrich-Wilhelm Mohrbutter, was an orchestra conductor. He attended the Christianeum then, from 1885 to 1887, the local trade school, where he learned to draw, using plaster models. From 1887 to 1890, he studied at the Grand-Ducal Saxon Art School, Weimar, with Leopold von Kalckreuth. In 1891, he returned to his parents' home in Hamburg, where he painted portraits of his friends and residents of the nearby poorhouse.

In 1893, he accompanied a friend to Paris, to study at the Académie Julian. There, under the influence of Gabriel Ferrier, he came to prefer pastels. Parisian life, in turn, influenced his choice of subject matter; fashion, fabrics and interesting color combinations. Back in Hamburg, he became part of the circle of artists associated with Justus Brinckmann, head of the Museum für Kunst und Gewerbe. At Brinckmann's suggestion, he studied etching with the Danish artist, Peter Alfred Schou, who was living in Hamburg at that time, and was  encouraged to create designs for the "Scherrebeker Webschule", a tapestry maker associated with the Gobelins Manufactory, a dozen of which were used. In addition, he designed posters for the Kunstmuseen Krefeld.

He moved to Berlin in 1900, to become a teacher at the Kunstgewerbeschule in Charlottenburg. He was also a strong supporter of the Victorian dress reform movement; designing clothing and fabrics. In 1904, he published Das Kleid der Frau. Ein Beitrag zur künstlerischen Gestaltung des Frauen-Kleides (The Woman's Dress), which was reprinted, with commentary, in 1985. Later, he widened his interests, to designing porcelain and glass.

After 1906, his health began to decline, and he spent much of his time on the coast, at Wyk auf Föhr, in an effort to recuperate. By 1908, he was forced to seek professional assistance, staying at the sanatorium operated by Erhard Hartung von Hartungen in Riva del Garda; frequented by notable people from all over Europe.

Despite his failing health, he continued to teach and exhibit; including a major showing at the Große Berliner Kunstausstellung in 1915. He died the following year, aged only forty-eight, at a sanatorium in the  Babelsberg district of Potsdam.

References

Further reading 
 "Mohrbutter, Alfred", In: Allgemeines Lexikon der Bildenden Künstler von der Antike bis zur Gegenwart, Vol. 25: Moehring–Olivié, E. A. Seemann, Leipzig 1931
 Carsten Meyer-Tönnesmann: Der Hamburgische Künstlerclub von 1897. Christians, Hamburg 1985, pp. 86–95 
 Manfred Meinz: "Die Schwarzburger Werkstätten für Porzellankunst und Alfred Mohrbutter", In: Zeitschrift der Gesellschaft der Keramikfreunde e.V. Ausgabe 62 Keramos, Düsseldorf, pp. 34–35
 RWLE Möller and Bernd Polster: "Alfred Mohrbutter", In: Celle. Das Stadtbuch. ES, Bonn 2003, pg.160 
 Alfred Mohrbutter, Das Kleid der Frau. Ein Beitrag zur künstlerischen Gestaltung des Frauen-Kleides / Mit weiteren Entwürfen von Peter Behrens, Kochs Monographien, Vol.2, Alexander Koch, Darmstadt 1904. Reprinted,  with commentary by Silvie Nützel-Lange, Edition Libri Rari, Verlag Schäfer, Hannover 1985,

External links 

 More works by Mohrbutter @ ArtNet
 Commentary on his portrait of Karl-Walter Natus @ Elbestadt Geesthacht

1867 births
1916 deaths
19th-century German painters
19th-century German male artists
German graphic designers
Académie Julian
Pastel artists
People from Celle
20th-century German painters
20th-century German male artists